Slim Chaker (August 24, 1961 – October 8, 2017) was a Tunisian politician who served as the Minister of Health from September, 12 to October 8, 2017 before his death. A member of Nidaa Tounes, he was the minister of Youth and Sports from July 1, until December 24, 2011, within the government of Beji Caid Essebsi.

Biography 

He is Minister of Youth and Sports from July to December 2011, in the government of Béji Caïd Essebsi. Became a member of Nidaa Tounes, he was the Minister of Finance in the government of Habib Essid from February 2015 to August 2016 and briefly Tunisian Minister of Public Health in the government of Youssef Chahed from September 2017 to his death.

References 

1961 births
2017 deaths
Finance ministers of Tunisia
Government ministers of Tunisia
People from Sfax
Nidaa Tounes politicians